Nadia Patricia Lawrence (born 29 November 1989) is a footballer who plays as a forward for the Wales national team. She won her first senior cap for Wales against Belgium in a 1–1 draw hosted at Mijnstadion, Beringen on 5 August 2012.

References

External links
 
 
 
 Nadia Lawrence profile at Football Association of Wales (FAW)

1989 births
Living people
Yeovil Town L.F.C. players
Wales women's international footballers
Welsh women's footballers
Women's Super League players
Cardiff City Ladies F.C. players
FA Women's National League players
Expatriate women's footballers in Iceland
Welsh expatriate footballers
Bristol Academy W.F.C. players
Welsh Premier Women's Football League players
Women's association football forwards
Welsh expatriate sportspeople in Iceland
Cardiff Met. Ladies F.C. players